Traherne Island is a  island in the Waitematā Harbour, very near Rosebank Peninsula, in Auckland, New Zealand. It is one of two islands surrounded by the Motu Manawa (Pollen Island) Marine Reserve, the other being Pollen Island. The  marine reserve was established in 1995.

Traherne Island is owned by the Crown and managed by NZ Transport Agency. The Northwestern Motorway runs along the island and connects it to the mainland by causeways and bridges.

Footprints of banded rail were found on the island in 2010. Surveys have found no archeological sites on the island.

References

External links
Motu Manawa (Pollen Island) Marine Reserve and features at the Department of Conservation
Motu Manawa (Pollen Island) Marine Reserve at Forest and Bird

Marine reserves of New Zealand
Islands of the Auckland Region
Protected areas established in 1995
Protected areas of the Auckland Region
Waitematā Harbour
Uninhabited islands of New Zealand
Whau Local Board Area
West Auckland, New Zealand